Glastonbury High School is a public, co-educational high school located in Glastonbury, Connecticut, United States.

It is the only high school in Glastonbury, and serves roughly 2,000 students and employs roughly 150 faculty members. The school is known for its excellent education, and is consistently ranked among the best in Connecticut and the nation.

Departments
Glastonbury High School has two support departments: School Counseling and Special Education/Pupil Services.

In addition to the two main support departments, students can receive extra assistance through the Math Center, Reading and Writing Center, and the Library Media Center.

The Mary A. Kingsbury Library at Glastonbury High School provides research material in the building and at home with a variety of print resources (i.e. books, magazines, reference material) and paid Internet databases (e.g. newspaper archives).

Activities
Glastonbury High School (GHS) offers a variety of clubs and activities for students, including rowing, cross-country, football, swimming and diving, field hockey, soccer, lacrosse, volleyball, wrestling and track teams.

Athletics
Glastonbury High School's athletic programs were ranked among the best in the state and country in 2015, coming in at number 1 in Connecticut and 14 nationally. The school's team name was the Tomahawks until 2020,  and was then changed to the Guardians.

State championships 
The Glastonbury Guardians have won state championships in the following sports and seasons:

 Boys and Girls Crew: 2014 (points champion), 2015, 2018 (points champion), 2019 (points champion)
 Boys Golf: 2014
 Boys Ice Hockey: 1999, 2003
 Boys Soccer: 1959, 1960, 1989, 1999, 2003, 2005, 2013, 2014, 2015, 2017, 2018 
 Boys Swimming and Diving: 1975
 Boys Track  1959-60, 2019
 Boys Tennis: 1985
 Boys Volleyball: 1996, 2002
 Field Hockey: 2010, 2014
 Football: 1984, 1989, 2008
 Girls Crew: 2011
 Girls Golf: 1996, 1998
 Girls Ice Hockey: 2015
 Girls Indoor Track: 2006, 2007, 2008, 2011, 2012, 2015
 Girls Outdoor Track: 2007, 2010
 Girls Soccer: 2011, 2014, 2015
 Girls Swimming and Diving: 1976
 Girls Tennis: 1991, 1992, 2016, 2017
 Girls Volleyball: 1993
 Girls Cross Country: 2004, 2005, 2007, 2008, 2010, 2013, 2014, 2015
 Gymnastics: 1988, 1989, 1994, 1995, 2011, 2012
 Wrestling: 1972, 1978

Renovations and building history
A renovation was completed in September, 2007. New science labs and classrooms were added to the school. The old science wing, auditorium, and gym facilities received major renovations, and the library and cafeteria each received an addition.

The Glastonbury Education Foundation funded a state-of-the-art digital television studio in May, 2008.

Glastonbury High School was built in 1952 (wings B, E, and F), and has received the following:
2007: Added a science wing (A wing), additional renovations done to the building (particularly the former science wing - newer part of C wing)

In June 2016, the school board approved plans to build a brand new artificial turf soccer field with lights on the Baldwin Fields behind the school building. The field is planned to be built in 2017 and is estimated to cost around $1.6 million. Included in the plan are bleachers for 250 spectators, a fence around the field, and ball netting to catch loose balls. Space will be set aside for another project in the future which will include storage, bathrooms, and locker rooms.

Notable alumni
Laura Ingraham (1981), conservative political commentator, author, and radio host
Amy Brenneman (1982), actress, writer and producer
Jarosław Wałęsa (1995), member of the European Parliament for Poland
Ocean Vuong (2006), poet, essayist, and novelist
Donn Cabral (2008) cross country and track runner, competed in 2012 and 2016 summer Olympics 
Alexandra Rojas (2013), political commentator, Executive Director of Justice Democrats

References

External links

 Glastonbury Public Schools

Glastonbury, Connecticut
Schools in Hartford County, Connecticut
Public high schools in Connecticut